The Vunta Formation is a geologic formation in Northwest Territories. It preserves fossils dating back to the Silurian period.

See also

 List of fossiliferous stratigraphic units in Northwest Territories

References
 

Silurian Northwest Territories
Ordovician northern paleotropical deposits
Silurian northern paleotropical deposits